Rising may refer to:
 Rising, a stage in baking - see Proofing (baking technique)
Elevation
 Short for Uprising, a rebellion

Film and TV
 "Rising" (Stargate Atlantis), the series premiere of the science fiction television program Stargate Atlantis
 "Rising" (Dark Angel), an episode of the television series Dark Angel
 Rising (news show), a news show hosted by Ryan Grim and Robby Soave of The Hill

Books
 Rising (novel), the last novel of R. C. Hutchinson

Places
 Rising, Illinois, United States, an unincorporated community
 Rising City, Nebraska, United States, a village
 Rising River, a river in California
 Rising, the flow of water to the surface from underground - see spring (hydrosphere)

Surname
 Melbourne Rising, an Australian rugby union team
 John Rising (1756–1815), English portrait and subject painter
 Linda Rising, American author, lecturer and consultant
 Nelson Rising, American businessman
 Pop Rising (1877-1938), American Major League Baseball player in 1905

Music

Albums
 Rising (Rainbow album)
 Rising (Donovan album)
 Rising (Yoko Ono album)
 Rising (Seraphim album)
 Rising (Stuck Mojo album)
 Rising (Great White album)
 Rising (The Go Set album)

Songs
 "Rising", by Lovebites from Clockwork Immortality
 "Rising", by Prince Buster

Other uses
 Rising Auto, an automotive brand of SAIC Motor

See also 
 The Rising (disambiguation)
 Rise (disambiguation)